In enzymology, a theanine hydrolase is an enzyme that catalyzes the chemical reaction

N5-ethyl-L-glutamine + H2O  L-glutamate + ethylamine

Thus, the two substrates of this enzyme are N5-ethyl-L-glutamine and H2O, whereas its two products are L-glutamate and ethylamine.

This enzyme belongs to the family of hydrolases, those acting on carbon-nitrogen bonds other than peptide bonds, specifically in linear amides.  The systematic name of this enzyme class is N5-ethyl-L-glutamine amidohydrolase. Other names in common use include L-theanine amidohydrolase, and 5-N-ethyl-L-glutamine amidohydrolase.

References

 

EC 3.5.1
Enzymes of unknown structure